Calvin Larry Morris is a former running back in the National Football League. He was a member of the Green Bay Packers during the 1987 NFL season.

References

1962 births
Players of American football from North Carolina
Green Bay Packers players
American football running backs
Syracuse Orange football players
Living people
People from Fort Bragg, North Carolina
National Football League replacement players